List of banks in Moldova:

Central bank
 National Bank of Moldova

Commercial banks
 Victoriabank
 BCR Chișinău
 Comerțbank
 Energbank
 EuroCreditBank
 EximBank
 FinComBank
 MobiasBanca
 ProCredit Bank

This is based on the official list of licensed banks registered in Moldova published by the National Bank of Moldova.

Banks being monitored
 Moldova Agroindbank
 Moldindconbank

Banks undergoing liquidation
 Bancosind
 Basarabia
 BIID MB
 Bucuriabank
 Guinea
 Întreprinzbancă
 InvestPrivatBank
 Oguzbank
 Universalbank
 Vias

Defunct banks
 Banca de Economii
 Banca Socială
 Unibank
 Banca Municipală Chișinău
 BTR Moldova
 Businessbank

References

Chișinău
Banks of Moldova
Moldova
Banks
Moldova